The Finns Point Range Rear Light is a lighthouse in Pennsville Township, Salem County, New Jersey.  It is located just east of the Delaware River and was part of Range light pair that guided ships into the Delaware River.  It is deactivated, and its lamp and lens have been removed, but the lighthouse is open to the public as part of a National Wildlife Refuge.  It was designed and built in 1877 and is a classic example of a skeletal cast iron prefabricated lighthouse. Its companion Front range light was demolished and replaced with an offshore automated light in 1938. Both the Rear and replacement Front lights were deactivated in 1950.

External links
New Jersey Lighthouse Society Home Page: Finns Point Lighthouse 
Finns Point Lighthouse- from Lighthousefriends.com

Lighthouses on the National Register of Historic Places in New Jersey
Transportation buildings and structures in Salem County, New Jersey
Lighthouses completed in 1877
National Register of Historic Places in Salem County, New Jersey
1877 establishments in New Jersey

ja:サンディフック灯台